About Faces is an American game show that aired from January 4, 1960, to June 30, 1961, created by Ralph Edwards. The host was Ben Alexander and the show's announcer was Tom Kennedy.

Gameplay
Two contestants were given clues about incidents in their lives. The first contestant to guess the relationship with the opposite person correctly was the winner and won prizes.

There was also a home-participation game called Place the Face, inspired by an earlier Ralph Edwards creation of the same name.

Episode status
The UCLA Film and Television Archive lists among its holdings the premiere episode with Zsa Zsa Gabor, Red Schoendienst (and family), Fred Haney, and Douglas "Wrong Way" Corrigan. The March 17 edition exists on YouTube with Tom Kennedy as substitute host.

The Paley Center for Media lists among its holdings the series pilot, taped May 6, 1959. José Ferrer and Rosemary Clooney are listed as the celebrity guests for that episode.

References

External links
 

1960 American television series debuts
1961 American television series endings
1960s American game shows
American Broadcasting Company original programming
Black-and-white American television shows
English-language television shows
Television series by Ralph Edwards Productions